Ischalia costata is a species of broad-hipped flower beetle in the family Ischaliidae. It is found in North America.

References

Further reading

 
 
 

Tenebrionoidea
Beetles described in 1861